

Khatkhate surname

Khatkhate (खतखतें) is a well-known last name in Saraswat Brahmin (GSB) community hailing from Konkan province of Maharashtra state and the coastal region of Goa in India. Additional information on the surname is available at Khatkhate Wadi.

Khatkhate curry

In Indian Cuisine, khatkhate (खतखतें) curry is an exotic mixed vegetable stew of Goan cuisine. This dish is usually prepared for weddings, pujas, and other occasions. Khatkhate is a Goan and Konkani dish.

Khatkhate curry is prepared with at least five vegetables, plus grated coconut, jaggery, kokum, tamarind, tirphala/tepphal (Sichuan pepper — a special spice from the Konkan region), dried red chili, garam masala powder, and turmeric powder. The vegetables include radish (mooli), potato, sweet potato (ratala), carrots, corn on the cob, pumpkins (bhopala), and any seasonal vegetables.

Khatkhate ladu

In Konkani Cuisine, Khatkhate ladu (खतखतें लाडू) is a traditional gourmet delicacy from Malvan, Maharashtra. Khatkhate ladu are prepared by binding,  in a ball, sugar-coated crispy croissants (called "khaja" by native Konkani population). The specialty of Khatkhate ladu is that they are very dry, hard and crisp from outside but contain moist and soft cores that are often filled with sugary syrup.  

Goan cuisine
Konkani cuisine